Austrophasma is a genus of insects in the family Mantophasmatidae. It contains 3 species that are endemic to Western Cape Province, South Africa.

Species
These species belong to the genus Austrophasma:

 Austrophasma caledonense Klass, Picker, Damgaard, van Noort & Tojo, 2003
 Austrophasma gansbaaiense Klass, Picker, Damgaard, van Noort & Tojo, 2003
 Austrophasma rawsonvillense Klass, Picker, Damgaard, van Noort & Tojo, 2003

References

Mantophasmatidae
Insects of South Africa
Endemic fauna of South Africa